Now That's What I Call Music! 6 was released on April 3, 2001. The album is the sixth edition of the Now! series in the United States. It debuted at number one on the Billboard 200, selling 525,000 units in its first week of release. It is the second number-one album in the series, following Now 4, and has been certified 3× Platinum by the RIAA. The album features three Billboard Hot 100 number-one hits: "Independent Women Part I", "It Wasn't Me", and "With Arms Wide Open".

Track listing

Chart performance

See also
List of Billboard 200 number-one albums of 2001

References

2001 compilation albums
 006
Epic Records compilation albums